Arthur Gee (June 1892 in Earlestown, Newton-le-Willows, Lancashire – 1959) was an English professional footballer. He played in the Football League for Oldham Athletic and Rochdale.

Gee played for his local side Earlestown before joining Oldham Athletic. In the 1913-14 season, Gee was joint top scorer (with Oliver Tummon, scoring ten times as Oldham finished 4th in Division One. The following season they finished runners-up to Everton. Gee remained with the Latics during World War I and was again top scorer, with 13 goals in the 1919-20 season.

He left Oldham to join Stalybridge Celtic, but returned to the Football League with Rochdale. He then played for Ashton National and Nuneaton Town before joining Mossley where he was captain during 1926-27 season. On leaving Mossley he joined Witton Albion.

References

1892 births
1959 deaths
People from Newton-le-Willows
English footballers
Oldham Athletic A.F.C. players
Stalybridge Celtic F.C. players
Rochdale A.F.C. players
Ashton National F.C. players
Nuneaton Borough F.C. players
Mossley A.F.C. players
Witton Albion F.C. players
English Football League players
Association football forwards
Earlestown F.C. players